Munyo Solomon Mutai (born 22 October 1992 in Bukwo) is a Ugandan long-distance runner.

He started his career over shorter distances and at the 2009 Ugandan Championships he placed ninth over 1500 metres and fourth in the 3000 metres steeplechase. At the age of 18 years he was runner-up at the national 5000 metres, second to Moses Kipsiro. His half marathon debut came in Kampala and he was runner-up behind his compatriot Nathan Ayeko with a time of 1:01:26 hours. He set two personal bests at the 2013 Ugandan Championships, running 13:33.80 minutes for the 5000 m and 28:44.81 minutes for the 10,000 metres, having placed fourth at both distances. He made his debut in road events at the end of the year and was in the top ten at the BOClassic and Corrida de Houilles 10K runs. He also won the half marathon section of the Nairobi Marathon that year.

He made his international debut for Uganda at the 2014 IAAF World Half Marathon Championships and helped Uganda to fifth in the team race by finishing 26th overall. He was then selected to run the marathon at the 2014 Commonwealth Games where he finished fourth. He won a silver medal at the marathon event at the 2018 Commonwealth Games.

Personal bests
1500 metres – 3:50.8 min (2009)
5000 metres – 13:33.80 min (2013)
10,000 metres – 28:44.81 min (2013)
10K run – 28:45 min (2013)
Half marathon – 1:01:26 hrs (2014)
3000 metres steeplechase – 9:15.4 min (2009)
marathon – 2:08:10 hrs (2022)

International competition record

References

External links

Living people
1992 births
Ugandan male long-distance runners
Ugandan male marathon runners
Ugandan male steeplechase runners
Olympic athletes of Uganda
People from Eastern Region, Uganda
Athletes (track and field) at the 2014 Commonwealth Games
Athletes (track and field) at the 2016 Summer Olympics
World Athletics Championships athletes for Uganda
World Athletics Championships medalists
Commonwealth Games medallists in athletics
Commonwealth Games silver medallists for Uganda
21st-century Ugandan people
Medallists at the 2018 Commonwealth Games